Spixworth is a village and civil parish in the English county of Norfolk.
For the purposes of local government, it falls within the district of Broadland.

Etymology 

The village was known as Spikeswurda in Norman times and the name is believed to be derived from either the River Spikes (now Spixworth Beck) or Spic meaning 
swine pasture. The suffix worth is from the Anglo-Saxon yrth meaning land sloping from water or marsh. Alternatively the name is possibly derived from the OE spics (bacon farm) and worth (enclosure).

History 

From Saxon times the village has been part of the Taverham Hundred. Prior to the Norman conquest of 1066 much of the land was held by a Saxon freeman known as Suart. After the conquest, Spixworth and other surrounding villages were given to Roger of Poictiers. In 1199, Peter Bardoph became Lord of the Manor, a position the family held to 1485. The estate was eventually sold to William Peck in 1602. Peck, Sheriff of Norwich in 1561 and Mayor of the city in 1573 and 1586, built Spixworth Hall in 1607. The house and estate was subsequently purchased by the Longe family in 1693 and remained in the family until 1950 when the hall was sold. The hall subsequently fell into disrepair and was demolished in 1952. The title, Lord of the Manor is still owned by Longe family as well as the surrounding lands.

The village today 
Due to its proximity to Norwich the village is a popular residential area. Amenities include an infant school, a junior school, a dental practice, a doctor's surgery, a village hall, a motel, the Longe Arms public house and a wide selection of retail outlets and services.

The Church of St Peter 
A church has stood on the same site for 900 years. The present day church dates from 1160 and is built in the Early English style. The narrow pencil shaped tower is the oldest part of the church. Inside the building is a Norman font. Also, of note is the 17th century memorial depicting two life–sized corpses and the church bells some of which date from 1350.

Public transport

Bus

Scheduled services link the village to Norwich and further afield.

Sport and leisure
The football club Norwich CBS played in the village between 2009 and 2017 under the name Spixworth Football Club.

Gallery

References

External links 

Geograph images

 
Villages in Norfolk
Civil parishes in Norfolk
Broadland